Dirt 5 is a simcade racing video game developed and published by Codemasters. The game was released for PlayStation 4, Windows, and Xbox One on 6 November 2020, for Xbox Series X/S on 10 November, and for PlayStation 5 on 12 November (for North America, Oceania, Japan, and South Korea) and 19 November (for most other regions), for Stadia on 24 March 2021, and for Luna on 15 July 2021. It was the last video game released by Codemasters as a publisher before acquired by Electronic Arts (EA) on 18 February 2021.

Gameplay
Dirt 5 is a racing game focused on off-road racing. Disciplines within the game include rallycross, ice racing, Stadium Super Trucks and off-road buggies. Players can compete in events in a wide range of locations, namely Arizona, Brazil, China, Greece, Italy, Morocco, Nepal, New York City, Norway and South Africa. The game includes a dynamic weather system and seasons, which affect the racing; for example, the player can only compete in ice racing events in New York during winter months. A four-player splitscreen system is also introduced into the game.

Dirt 5 also features a narrative-focused career mode that pits the player character against a rival driver called Bruno Durand (voiced by Nolan North) in a series of championships. The player also has a mentor called Alex “AJ” Janiček (voiced by Troy Baker) who provides them with advice throughout their career. The game was also not to feature a cinematic replay. Instead, the game would follow in a series of podcasts by Donut Media that follows the storyline.

Development and release
Dirt 5 was announced during the 2020 Xbox Games Showcase presentation. In addition to releasing on the PlayStation 4, Windows, and Xbox One platforms, it was available for the ninth generation of video game consoles PlayStation 5 and Xbox Series X. Xbox versions of the game support Microsoft's "Smart Delivery" program, which allows the player to purchase the Xbox One copy of the game and receive the Xbox Series X version. PlayStation 4 owners can also update to the PlayStation 5 version at no additional cost. The game was developed by Codemasters Cheshire, formerly known as Codemasters Evo, developers of Onrush. It is also powered by the evolved game engine of Onrush. Many of its staff worked on Driveclub and MotorStorm.

Reception

It was nominated for the category of Best Sports/Racing game at The Game Awards 2020.

Praising the 120 Hz refresh rate, PlayStation Official Magazine – UK listed it as the 5th best game on the PS5.

References

External links
 

2020 video games
Codemasters games
Colin McRae Rally and Dirt series
Multiplayer and single-player video games
Rally racing video games
PlayStation 4 games
PlayStation 5 games
Split-screen multiplayer games
Stadia games
Video games set in Greece
Video games set in Arizona
Video games set in Brazil
Video games set in China
Sports video games set in Italy
Video games set in Morocco
Video games set in Nepal
Video games set in New York City
Video games set in Norway
Video games set in South Africa
Video games using procedural generation
Video games with cross-platform play
Windows games
Xbox Cloud Gaming games
Xbox One games
Xbox Series X and Series S games
Video games developed in the United Kingdom